Lophalia cribricollis is a species of beetle in the family Cerambycidae.

Background
It was described by Bates in 1892.

References

Trachyderini
Beetles described in 1892